Duets Vancouver 1989 is a live album by American saxophonist and composer Anthony Braxton with pianist Marilyn Crispell recorded  at the Vancouver Jazz Festival in 1989 and released on the Music & Arts label.

Reception

The AllMusic review by Scott Yanow stated "The music is a mixture of composition and improvisation (it is often difficult to know which is which). Although it will not win any new converts who are put off by the complexity of Braxton's music, repeated listenings to these dynamic performances will result in listeners gain in better understanding and appreciating these masterful musicians".

The authors of the Penguin Guide to Jazz Recordings wrote: "The Vancouver duets are as warmly approachable as anything Braxton has done. There is no soft pedaling from Crispell, and she may even be the more compelling voice."

Author Francis Davis commented: "On Duets Vancouver 1989... Braxton and... Crispell make improvised Webern out of four of Braxton's diagrammatic compositions. In the process Crispell demonstrates her ability to animate even Braxton's most static lines..."

Bill Shoemaker praised Crispell for "a command of Braxton's music that no other pianist has as consistently demonstrated," and wrote: "Her pace-setting performance on the non-stop Duets Vancouver 1989 has a palpable energy. It's this quality that prompts occasional comparisons to Cecil Taylor; but, throughout the program, Crispell's motivic orientation and tactical use of clusters, crossovers, and percussive octaves are clearly her own."

Track listing
All compositions by Anthony Braxton.

 "Composition No. 136" - 10:11
 "Composition No. 140 (+ 112 + 30)" - 11:50
 "Composition No. 62" - 11:01
 "Composition No. 116" - 12:25

Personnel
Anthony Braxton – alto saxophone, flute
Marilyn Crispell – piano

References

Music & Arts live albums
Anthony Braxton live albums
Marilyn Crispell live albums
1990 live albums